Agonopterix nanatella is a moth of the family Depressariidae. It is found in most of Europe, except Fennoscandia, Poland, Ukraine, the Baltic region and most of the Balkan Peninsula.

The wingspan is 15–19 mm. The forewings are pale whitish ochreous, brownish-tinged and strewn with brown strigulae , costa marked with spots of darker strigulae; first and sometimes second discal stigmata dark fuscous; sometimes a suffused fuscous spot between and above these. Hindwings grey, darker posteriorly. The larva is yellow-green; dots grey; dorsal line darker; head and plate of 2 black

Adults are on wing from July to August.

The larvae of ssp. nanatella feed on Carlina vulgaris. They initially mine the leaves of their host plant. The mine has the form of a blotch mine. Older larvae vacate their mines and continues feeding from within a rolled leaf. The larvae of ssp. aridella feed on Cirsium species. They may also create a blotch mine, which is full depth and little contracted. It is mostly limited to the leaf tip. Not all larvae mine though, some live freely on the leaves of their host. Pupation takes place outside of the mine.

Larvae can be found from April to May (aridella) or June (nanatella). They are pale yellowish green with a black head.

Subspecies
Agonopterix nanatella nanatella
Agonopterix nanatella aridella Mann, 1869 (southern Europe)

References

Moths described in 1849
Agonopterix
Moths of Europe
Taxa named by Henry Tibbats Stainton